The so-called Table Jura or Plateau Jura is the northeastern extension of the Jura Mountains. It stands in opposition to the folded Jura of the Jura range proper. 

The Table Jura stretches across the Swiss cantons of Basel-Landschaft, Aargau, and Schaffhausen (Randen) into southern Germany (Baden-Württemberg, Bavaria), including the Hoher Randen, Baar, the Swabian Jura and the Franconian Jura. The Table Jura thus ranges from near the Swiss city of Basel to the German city of Coburg.

Mountain ranges of Switzerland
Mountain ranges of Germany